Mötley Crüe is an American heavy metal band formed in Hollywood, California  in 1981. The group was founded by bassist Nikki Sixx, drummer Tommy Lee, lead guitarist Mick Mars and lead singer Vince Neil. Mötley Crüe has sold over 100 million albums worldwide. They have also achieved seven platinum or multi-platinum certifications, nine Top 10 albums on the Billboard 200 chart (including 1989's Dr. Feelgood, which is Mötley Crüe's only album to reach number one), twenty-two Top 40 mainstream rock hits, and six Top 20 pop singles. The band experienced several short-term lineup changes in the 1990s and 2000s; these included the introduction of vocalist John Corabi (who was Neil's replacement from 1992 to 1996) and drummers Randy Castillo and Samantha Maloney, both of whom filled in for Lee following his departure from Mötley Crüe in 1999; he returned to the band in 2004. More recently in 2022 guitarist Mick Mars announced his retirement from touring with the band, with former Marilyn Manson and Rob Zombie guitarist John 5 taking his place on live duties.

The members of Mötley Crüe have often been noted for their hedonistic lifestyles and the androgynous personae they maintained. Following the hard rock and heavy metal origins on the band's first two albums, Too Fast for Love (1981) and Shout at the Devil (1983), the release of its third album Theatre of Pain (1985) saw Mötley Crüe joining the first wave of glam metal. The band has also been known for their elaborate live performances, which feature flame thrower guitars, roller coaster drum kits, and heavy use of pyrotechnics (fireworks) (including lighting Sixx on fire). Mötley Crüe's last studio album, Saints of Los Angeles, was released on June 24, 2008. What was planned to be the band's final show took place on New Year's Eve, December 31, 2015. The concert was filmed for a theatrical and Blu-ray release in 2016.

After two-and-a-half years of inactivity, Neil announced in September 2018 that Mötley Crüe had reunited and was working on new material. On March 22, 2019, the band released four new songs on the soundtrack for its Netflix biopic The Dirt, based on the band's New York Times best-selling autobiography of the same name. The soundtrack went to number one on the iTunes All Genres Album Chart, number 3 on the Billboard Top Album and Digital Album sales charts, number 10 on the Billboard 200, and Top 10 worldwide. The autobiography returned to New York Times Best Seller list at number 6 on Nonfiction Print and number 8 on Nonfiction Combined Print & E-Book. Mötley Crüe embarked on its first major tour in seven years in the summer and fall of 2022, co-headlining a North American tour with Def Leppard.

History

1981–1983: Early history and Too Fast for Love
Mötley Crüe was formed on January 17, 1981, when bassist Nikki Sixx left the band London and began rehearsing with drummer Tommy Lee and vocalist/guitarist Greg Leon. Lee had previously worked with Leon in a band called Suite 19 and the trio practiced together for some time; Leon eventually decided not to continue with them. Sixx and Lee then began a search for new members and soon met guitarists Robin Moore (Jeff Gill) and Bob Deal, better known as Mick Mars, after answering an advertisement that he placed in The Recycler that read: "Loud, rude and aggressive guitar player available". Mars auditioned for Sixx, Moore and Lee, and was subsequently hired while Moore was fired at the same session according to the band's biography The Dirt. Although a lead vocalist named O'Dean was auditioned, Lee had known Vince Neil from their high school days at Charter Oak High School in Covina, California, and the two had performed in different bands on the garage band circuit. Upon seeing him perform with the band Rock Candy at the Starwood in Hollywood, California, Mars suggested they have Neil join the band. At first Neil refused the offer, but as the other members of Rock Candy became involved in outside projects, Neil grew anxious to try something else. Lee asked again; Neil was hired on April 1, 1981, and the band played its first gig at the Starwood nightclub on April 24.

The newly formed band did not yet have a name. Sixx has said that he told his bandmates that he was "thinking about calling the band "Christmas". The other members were not very receptive to that idea. Then, while trying to find a suitable name, Mars remembered an incident that occurred when he was playing with a band called White Horse, when one of the other band members called the group "a motley looking crew". He had remembered the phrase and later copied it down as 'Mottley Cru'. After modifying the spelling slightly, "Mötley Crüe" was eventually selected as the band's name, with the stylistic decision suggested by Neil to add the two sets of metal umlauts, supposedly inspired by the German beer Löwenbräu, which the members were drinking at the time. Other than the periods of February 1992 to September 1996 and of March 1999 to September 2004, the lineup of Neil, Sixx, Lee, and Mars remained the same.

The band soon met its first manager, Allan Coffman, the thirty-eight-year-old brother-in-law of a friend of Mars's driver. The band's first release was the single "Stick to Your Guns/Toast of the Town", which was released on its own record label, Leathür Records, which had a pressing and distribution deal with Greenworld Distribution in Torrance, California. In November 1981, its debut album Too Fast for Love was self-produced and released on Leathür, selling 20,000 copies. Coffman's assistant Eric Greif set up a tour of Canada, while Coffman and Greif used Mötley Crüe's success in the Los Angeles club scene to negotiate with several record labels, eventually signing a recording contract with Elektra Records in early 1982. The debut album was then re-mixed by producer Roy Thomas Baker and re-released on August 20, 1982—two months after its Canadian Warner Music Group release using the original Leathür mixes—to coincide with the tour.

During the "Crüesing Through Canada Tour '82", there were several widely publicized incidents. First, the band was arrested and then released at Edmonton International Airport for wearing their spiked stage wardrobe (considered "dangerous weapons") through customs, and for Neil arriving with a small carry-on filled with porn magazines (considered "indecent material"); both were staged PR stunts. Customs eventually had the confiscated items destroyed. Second, while playing Scandals Disco in Edmonton, a spurious "bomb threat" against the band made the front page of the Edmonton Journal on June 9, 1982; Lee and assistant band manager Greif were interviewed by police as a result. This too ended up being a staged PR stunt perpetrated by Greif. Lastly, Lee threw a television set from an upper story window of the Sheraton Caravan Hotel. Canadian rock magazine Music Express noted that the band was "banned for life" from the city. Despite the tour ending prematurely in financial disaster, it was the basis for the band's first international press.

In 1983, the band changed management from Coffman to Doug Thaler and Doc McGhee. McGhee is best known for managing Bon Jovi and later Kiss, starting with their reunion tour in 1996. Greif subsequently sued all parties in a Los Angeles Superior Court action that dragged on for several years, and coincidentally later re-surfaced as manager of Sixx's former band, London. Coffman himself was sued by several investors to whom he had sold "stock in the band", including Michigan-based Bill Larson. Coffman eventually declared bankruptcy, as he had mortgaged his home at least three times to cover band expenses.

1983–1991: International fame and addiction struggles
"Too Fast For Love", the title track from the band's debut album, was reportedly recorded over a span of three days while the band members were under the influence of alcohol.  Their antics included, according to the website "Page Six" urinating in public or on the floors of their bedrooms, and throwing beds and furniture such as futons out of hotel windows in Hamburg, Germany. Nikki Sixx had been arrested for the first time while selling "chocolate" mescaline at a Rolling Stones concert in 1973. The band became rapidly successful in the United States after playing at the US Festival in May 1983, and also with the aid of the new medium of MTV. Their second album, Shout at the Devil, was released in September 1983. The album represented the band's mainstream breakthrough and would eventually be certified 4× platinum. The album generated controversy for its title track and album imagery, both of which invoked Satanism. They then gained the attention of heavy metal legend Ozzy Osbourne and found themselves as the opening act for Osbourne on his 1984 tour for Bark at the Moon. The band members were well known for their backstage antics, outrageous clothing, extreme high-heeled boots, heavily applied make-up, and seemingly endless abuse of alcohol and drugs as well.

The band members also had their share of run ins with the law. On December 8, 1984, Neil was driving home from a liquor run in his De Tomaso Pantera which ended in a head-on collision; his passenger, Hanoi Rocks drummer Nicholas "Razzle" Dingley, was killed. Neil, charged with a DUI and vehicular manslaughter, was sentenced to 30 days in jail (although he served only 18 days) and subsequently was sued for $2,500,000. The short jail term was negotiated by his lawyers, enabling Neil to tour and pay the civil suit.

The band's third album Theatre of Pain was released in June 1985 and dedicated in Dingley's honor, and it started a new glam metal phase in the band's style. Theatre of Pain was commercially successful, reaching number 6 on the Billboard album charts and eventually being certified quadruple platinum. However, the recording of the album was fraught with tension in the wake of Neil's accident and Sixx's growing addiction, and members of the band have said that they consider it a creative disappointment.

Mötley Crüe spent most of the next year on a world tour in support of Theatre of Pain. In February 1986 in London, England Sixx suffered a near-fatal heroin overdose, and the person who sold him the drugs dumped his unconscious body in a dumpster. The incident inspired Sixx to write the song "Dancing on Glass" for their next album.

The band's fourth album, Girls, Girls, Girls, was released in May 1987 and debuted at number 2 on the Billboard 200. Sixx has said in interviews that he believes the album would have debuted at number 1 if not for behind the scenes maneuvering by Whitney Houston's record label. The band again changed their look for the album and subsequent tour, trading the glam elements of the previous album for a biker aesthetic. The band faced many of the same personal issues that plagued the recording of Theatre of Pain and Sixx has complained that those issues compromised the album's quality, although he has spoken more positively about the record in subsequent years.

On December 23, 1987, Sixx suffered a heroin overdose. He was declared clinically dead on the way to the hospital, but the paramedic, who was a Crüe fan, revived Sixx with two shots of adrenaline. His two minutes in death were the inspiration for the song "Kickstart My Heart", which peaked at No. 16 on the Mainstream U.S. chart, and which was featured on 1989's Dr. Feelgood, their first U.S. number one album. From 1986 to 1987, Sixx kept a daily diary of his heroin addiction and eventually entered rehab in January 1988.

In 1988, controversy again hit the band in the form of a lawsuit by Matthew Trippe. Trippe claimed that Sixx was hospitalized in 1983 after a car crash involving drugs and that he had been hired as Sixx's doppelgänger. The suit was regarding the loss of royalties from his time in Mötley Crüe and the case was not closed until 1993 when Trippe dropped his charges and disappeared from public view.

Their decadent lifestyles almost shattered the band until managers Thaler and McGhee pulled an intervention and refused to allow the band to tour in Europe, fearing that "some [of them] would come back in bodybags". Shortly after, all the band members jointly entered drug rehabilitation in an effort to move forward as a band.

After finding sobriety, Mötley Crüe reached its peak popularity with the release of their fifth album, the Bob Rock-produced Dr. Feelgood, on September 1, 1989. Rock and the band recorded the album in Vancouver, with the band members recording their parts separately for the first time to reduce infighting and to focus on individual performance. Aerosmith lead singer Steven Tyler, who was recording the album Pump at the same studio, provided backing vocals. On October 14 of that year, it became a No. 1 album and stayed on the charts for 114 weeks after its release. The band members each stated in interviews that, due in no small part to their collective push for sobriety, Dr. Feelgood was their most solid album musically to that point. The title track and "Kickstart My Heart" were both nominated for Grammys in the Best Hard Rock Category in 1990 and 1991, respectively, but lost both years to songs by Living Colour. The band did find some success at the American Music Awards, as Dr. Feelgood was nominated twice for Favorite Hard Rock/Metal Award, losing once to Guns N' Roses' Appetite for Destruction, but winning the following year, beating out Aerosmith's Pump and Poison's Flesh & Blood. Mötley Crüe was also nominated twice for Favorite Hard Rock/Metal Artist.

In 1989, McGhee was fired after the band alleged he had broken several promises that he made in relation to the Moscow Music Peace Festival, including giving his other band, Bon Jovi, advantages in terms of slot placement. Thaler then assumed the role of sole band manager.

The band spent the fall of 1989 and most of 1990 on a massive world tour, the band's biggest to that point. It was a major financial success but left the band feeling burnt out. In April 1990, Lee suffered a concussion during a mishap involving a rappelling drum kit stunt during a live concert in New Haven, Connecticut.

On October 1, 1991, the band's first compilation album, Decade of Decadence 81-91, was released. It peaked at No. 2 on the Billboard 200 album chart. It was reportedly designed as "just something for the fans" while the band worked on the next "all new" album.

1992–2003: Years of turmoil
Vince Neil left the band in February 1992 following the release of Decade of Decadence, during a period in which most other prominent glam metal bands of the 1980s were breaking up or otherwise seeing their popularity decline significantly amid the advent of grunge and alternative music. It remains unclear whether Neil was fired or quit the band. Sixx has long maintained that Neil quit, while Neil insists that he was fired. "Any band has its little spats," Neil observed in 2000, "and this one basically just stemmed from a bunch of 'fuck yous' in a rehearsal studio. It went from 'I quit' to 'You're fired' ... It was handled idiotically. The management just let one of the biggest bands in the world break up."

In the running for the vacant frontman position was Kik Tracee vocalist Stephen Shareaux. Ultimately Neil was replaced by John Corabi (formerly of Angora and the Scream). Although Mötley's self-titled March 1994 release made the Billboard top ten (#7), the album was a commercial failure. It also prompted negative reactions from many fans due to Neil's absence and its sound. Corabi suggested the band bring back Neil, believing the latter would always be seen as the voice of the band. This eventually resulted in his own firing in 1996. Corabi spoke about his time with the band and his thoughts on the first record with Mötley Crüe. Corabi said: "my record was the first record that they had done that didn't go platinum, didn't make some sort of crazy noise, and everybody panicked". During his time away from the band, Neil released a moderately successful solo album, Exposed in 1993, and a less commercially successful follow-up, Carved in Stone in 1995.

After Rolling Stone magazine broke out the news in their november 26 1996 issue, the band reunited with Neil in 1997, after their current manager, Allen Kovac, and Neil's manager, Bert Stein, set up a meeting between Neil, Lee, and Sixx. Agreeing to "leave their egos at the door", the band released Generation Swine. Although it debuted at No. 4, and in spite of a live performance at the American Music Awards, the album was a commercial failure, due in part to lack of support from their label.

In 1998, Mötley's contractual ties with Elektra had expired, putting the band in total control of their future, including the ownership of the master recordings of all of their albums. Announcing the end of their relationship with Elektra, the band became one of the few groups to own and control their publishing and music catalog. They are one of only a handful of artists to own the masters to their material and reportedly did so by being the biggest pain they could be until Elektra got fed up and handed over the rights in order to get the band off their label. After leaving Elektra the band created their own label, Mötley Records.

Mötley released their compilation Greatest Hits in late 1998, featuring two new songs, "Bitter Pill" and "Enslaved". In 1999, the band rereleased all their albums, dubbed as "Crücial Crüe". These limited-edition digital remasters included demos, plus live, instrumental, and previously unreleased tracks. In 1999 the band also released Supersonic and Demonic Relics, an updated version of Decade of Decadence featuring the original songs from that album and several previously unreleased B-sides and remixes, as well as their first official live album Entertainment or Death (which was the original working title for the studio album Theatre of Pain). The band then went on a co-headlining tour with The Scorpions.

In 1999, Lee quit to pursue a solo career, due to increasing tensions with Neil. "All we got was a call from his attorney saying he wasn't coming back," recalled the singer. "He wasn't into rock 'n' roll anymore. He even said that rock is dead ... It all happened during a void in Mötley. We weren't even rehearsing, so it was no big deal."

Lee was replaced by a longtime friend of the band, former Ozzy Osbourne drummer Randy Castillo. The band released New Tattoo in July 2000. Before the ensuing tour commenced, Castillo became ill with a duodenal ulcer. The band brought in former Hole drummer Samantha Maloney for the Maximum Rock tour with Megadeth as Castillo concentrated on his health. However, while Castillo was recovering from stomach surgery, he was diagnosed with squamous cell carcinoma after finding a tumor on his jaw. He died on March 26, 2002. Soon afterward, the band went on hiatus.

While the band was on hiatus, Sixx played in side projects 58 and Brides of Destruction. Neil was featured on the first season of VH1's reality show The Surreal Life, and had his own special titled "Remaking Vince Neil", which focused on his solo career and attempts to get in better physical shape. Mars, who suffers from a hereditary form of arthritis which causes extensive spinal pain called ankylosing spondylitis, went into seclusion in 2001 dealing with health issues. Lee went on to form Methods of Mayhem and also performed as a solo artist during this time.

A 2001 autobiography titled The Dirt, co-authored by all four of the band members and Neil Strauss, presented Mötley as "the world's most notorious rock band." The book made the top ten on The New York Times Best Seller list and spent ten weeks there, and would return to the list after the film adaptation was released in spring 2019.

In 2003, the band released two box sets entitled Music to Crash Your Car To: Vol. 1 and Vol. 2, featuring the music from their entire career. The titles of the collections were heavily criticized by Hanoi Rocks singer Michael Monroe, among others, due to their possible reference to Vince Neil and Razzle's fatal automobile accident, and that Neil was found guilty of manslaughter for the incident.

2004–2007: Reunion and renewed success

A promoter in England, Mags Revell, began clamoring for a Mötley Crüe reunion, ostensibly presenting himself as the voice of anxious fans waiting for more from the band. After meeting with management several times, in September 2004, Sixx announced that he and Neil had returned to the studio and had begun recording new material. In December 2004, the four original members announced a reunion tour, staging an announcement event in which they arrived at the Hollywood Palladium in a hearse. The tour began on February 14, 2005, in San Juan, Puerto Rico. The resulting compilation album, Red, White & Crüe, was released in February 2005. It features the band members' favorite original songs plus three new tracks, "If I Die Tomorrow", "Sick Love Song" (co-written by Sixx and James Michael), and a cover of the Rolling Stones' classic "Street Fighting Man". A small controversy was caused when it was suggested that neither Lee nor Mars played on the new tracks (duties were supposedly handled by Vandals drummer Josh Freese). However, a VH1 documentary of the band's reunion later showed that Lee did indeed play on some of the tracks. The Japanese release of Red, White & Crüe includes an extra new track titled "I'm a Liar (and That's the Truth)". Red, White & Crüe charted at No. 6 and has since gone platinum.

On New Year's Eve 2004 the band appeared on a live episode of The Tonight Show. Neil yelled an obscenity during the performance, leading to an FCC investigation. The NBC network responded by banning the band, leading to the band subsequently suing the network, claiming they were being unfairly punished. The lawsuit was eventually settled out of court and the band made several subsequent appearances on the network.

In 2005, Mötley Crüe was involved in an animation-comedy spoof Disaster!, which was written by Paul Benson and Matt Sullivan and which was used as the introduction film to concerts on their Carnival of Sins tour. That tour continued throughout 2005 and was commemorated with the release of a live album and DVD in 2006. In the fall of 2005 the band re-recorded "Home Sweet Home" as a duet with Linkin Park lead singer Chester Bennington and donated the proceeds to the victims of Hurricane Katrina.

In 2006, Mötley Crüe went on the Route of All Evil Tour, co-headlining with Aerosmith and taking performers from Lucent Dossier Experience on the road with them. 2006 also saw the band sign with Paramount Pictures and MTV Films to adapt their autobiography The Dirt into a movie, but the production was delayed for several years and the deal eventually fell through. In June 2007, Mötley Crüe set out on a small European tour. A lawsuit was filed by Neil, Mars and Sixx against Carl Stubner, Lee's manager. The three sued him for contracting for Lee to appear on two unsuccessful reality shows the band claim hurt its image. It was later reported on Motley.com that the lawsuit had been settled.

In 2007, Sixx published his diaries as the bestselling autobiography The Heroin Diaries: A Year in the Life of a Shattered Rock Star, covering the band's Girls, Girls, Girls world tour and his 1987 overdose, and Sixx's side project band Sixx:A.M. released The Heroin Diaries Soundtrack as a musical parallel to the novel.

2008–10: Saints of Los Angeles
The band hosted the Motley Cruise from January 24 to 28 in 2008; this featured Ratt, Skid Row and Slaughter.

On June 11, 2008, Mötley Crüe and manager Burt Stein filed suit against each other. Stein was Neil's personal manager and also, according to the band and rival manager Kovac, served as the band's manager at one time. The band and Kovac sued in Los Angeles County Superior Court, claiming Stein was not entitled to a cut of Mötley Crüe's earnings. Stein sued the same day in Nashville's federal court, saying he was entitled to 1.875 percent of what the band makes. Other litigation between the parties also ensued in Nevada. In July 2009, lawyers for both sides announced that the disputes had been "amicably resolved" through a "global settlement".

Mötley Crüe's ninth studio album, titled Saints of Los Angeles, was released in Japan on June 17, 2008, and in America on June 24, 2008. The album was originally titled The Dirt, as it was loosely based on the band's autobiography of the same name, but the title was later changed. In the US, the album was released by Eleven Seven Music. Eleven Seven also took over US distribution of their back catalog.

iTunes picked "Saints of Los Angeles" in their "Best of 2008" in the Rock category as the number one song. The song was also nominated for a Grammy Award in the "Best Hard Rock Performance" category, but lost to "Wax Simulacra" by The Mars Volta. The song was released in the music game series Rock Band as downloadable content the day the single was released. It was briefly sold as a Rock Band exclusive, making Mötley Crüe the first band to release a single exclusively through a video game. The song sold more units via Rock Band than it did via traditional streaming sites. Additionally, the entire Dr. Feelgood album was released as downloadable content in Rock Band, excluding "T.n.T. (Terror 'n Tinseltown)".

From July 1 to August 31, 2008, Mötley Crüe headlined the popular Crüe Fest music festival, which included opening acts Buckcherry, Papa Roach, Trapt, and Sixx:A.M. They then spent the fall and winter of that year on tour with Hinder, Theory of a Deadman and The Last Vegas.

The band made a guest appearance in the fourth season finale of the FOX crime dramedy Bones on May 14, 2009, entitled "The End in the Beginning", performing the song "Dr. Feelgood". The following month they performed at the Download Festival at the Donington Park motorsports circuit (June 12–14, 2009), playing on the second stage on Friday night.

Mötley Crüe headlined the Crüe Fest 2 festival, which ran from July to September 2009. Supporting them were Godsmack, Theory of a Deadman, Drowning Pool, and Charm City Devils. The band's set celebrated the 20th anniversary of Dr. Feelgood by performing the album in its entirety on each night of the tour. They also re-released the album as a special 20th anniversary deluxe edition.

Mötley Crüe headlined Ozzfest in 2010, along with Ozzy Osbourne and Rob Halford.  Neil also released his third solo album and autobiography, both entitled Tattoos and Tequila.

2011–2015: The Final Tour and retirement from touring

Mötley Crüe co-headlined a mid-year tour with Poison and special guests New York Dolls in 2011 for the band's 30th Anniversary and Poison's 25th anniversary. On August 30, 2011, Mötley Crüe, along with co-headliners Def Leppard and special guests Steel Panther, announced a UK Tour commencing in December 2011.

In February 2012 the band appeared along with supermodel Adriana Lima in a commercial for the Kia Optima, which premiered during Super Bowl XLVI. February 2012 also saw the band host its first residency at the Hard Rock Hotel and Casino in Las Vegas. In March 2012, Mötley Crüe announced a co-headlining tour with Kiss. The tour kicked off July 20 in Bristow, Virginia, and ran through September 23. In the spring and summer of 2013 the band toured throughout Canada with Big Wreck. The band returned to Las Vegas for a second residency in the fall of 2013.

On January 28, 2014, at the conference inside Beacher's Madhouse Theater in Hollywood, Mötley Crüe announced the full details of its retirement, including a tour initially spanning 70 North American dates, with Alice Cooper playing as a special guest. The tour commenced in Grand Rapids, Michigan, on July 2, 2014. The band members had signed a "cessation of touring agreement", which prevented them from touring under the Mötley Crüe name beyond the end of 2015. In a later interview, Sixx talked about the possibility of releasing new music, saying that "We have music written, [but] it's not put together yet". He also speculated that the band would release it in a song-by-song format as opposed to a full-length album format, elaborating with "It's hard, to be honest with you, to spend six [or] nine months to write eleven songs—all those lyrics ... everything ... the vocals, the guitars, the bass, the sonics, the mixing, the mastering, the artwork. ... You put it out and nothing [happens], because now people cherry-pick songs. So we go, 'Why don't we write songs and find vehicles to get one, two or four songs to ten million people rather than eleven songs to a hundred thousand people."

During the tour the band played a new song, "All Bad Things", over the speakers throughout the venue before it took the stage. On November 22, 2014, in Spokane, Washington, at the Spokane Arena, Mötley Crüe played the final concert of the first North American leg of The Final Tour.

On January 15, 2015, it was announced that the band's career would end with international concerts in Japan, Australia, Brazil and Europe before heading out for a second leg of North American concerts throughout 2015, ending with a concert at the MGM Grand Garden Arena in Las Vegas on December 27, followed by three concerts at Staples Center on December 28, 30 and 31, 2015. In May 2015, The Crüe and Alice Cooper announced a set of 12 concert dates for Europe at a conference in London.

On September 19, 2015, the band played the Rock in Rio festival on the main stage.

Mötley Crüe performed, for what was then advertised to be the last time, at Staples Center in Los Angeles on December 31, 2015. The band reported that its New Year's Eve show was going to be released as a film in 2016; the movie was titled Motley Crue: THE END.

2018–present: Reunion, The Dirt film, new music, return to touring, and Mars' retirement
In 2017, frontman Vince Neil told host Sammy Hagar on the show Rock and Roll Road Trip that Mötley Crüe were "completely done". However, on September 13, 2018, Neil announced via Twitter that Mötley Crüe was recording four new songs; this was later also confirmed by bassist Nikki Sixx, who said that the new material was recorded for the film adaptation of the band's biography, The Dirt. Neil also clarified that, though the band has signed a contract to no longer tour, they still plan to continue putting out new music for the future.

Netflix released The Dirt biopic based on the book of the same name that coincided with an 18-song soundtrack on March 22, 2019. The film is directed by Jeff Tremaine, (Jackass), produced by Julie Yorn and Erik Olsen, executive produced by Rick Yorn, and co-produced by Kovac who is Mötley Crüe's manager, CEO of Eleven Seven Label Group and founder of Tenth Street Entertainment. The Dirt stars Daniel Webber as Neil, Iwan Rheon (Game of Thrones) as Mars, Douglas Booth as Sixx and Colson Baker (aka Machine Gun Kelly) as Lee. Also starring in the movie is Pete Davidson (Saturday Night Live) as record executive Tom Zutaut. Rolling Stone wrote that The Dirt is "a truly debauched movie that delves deep into their rise from the early Eighties Sunset Strip metal scene to their days as arena headliners." The film portrays many of the adventures the band went on including touring with Ozzy Osbourne and the Theatre of Pain tour.

The first new song from the soundtrack was "The Dirt (Est.1981)", which was released on February 22, 2019. The band wrote two other new songs, "Ride With the Devil" and "Crash and Burn", and covered Madonna's "Like a Virgin", on the album. The soundtrack additionally included fourteen previously-released Mötley Crüe songs. It was produced by Bob Rock, who produced Dr. Feelgood, and was released on March 22, 2019, on Mötley Records and Eleven Seven Music. The soundtrack hit the Billboard Top 10 at No. 10, the first time Mötley Crüe hit the Billboard Top 10 in over a decade.

The group's legacy was also featured on a 2019 episode of the Reelz documentary series Breaking the Band. Both Neil and Sixx had a negative reaction to how things were portrayed in the episode. Sixx said they would be pursuing legal action and called Reelz "the bottom of the barrel."

In November 2019, rumors started to circulate of the band reuniting for a 2020 tour with Def Leppard and Poison, following the success of Guns N' Roses' reunion tour. The band responded to an online petition rallying for the group's return, saying "this is interesting...". On November 18, Rolling Stone magazine reported that all four band members had agreed to come back together for the tour, utilizing a loophole in their "Cessation of Touring" contract. Later that same day, the band confirmed all reports with a statement on their website, posting a press release and a video of the contract being destroyed. On December 4, 2019, it was officially confirmed that Mötley Crüe would embark on The Stadium Tour with Def Leppard, Poison and Joan Jett & the Blackhearts in the summer of 2020. Also in December 2019 Mick Mars announced that his debut solo album would be released in the spring of 2020. On June 1, 2020, Mötley Crüe announced that The Stadium Tour would be rescheduled to June–September 2021 due to the COVID-19 pandemic; it was postponed once again to 2022, due to similar circumstances amid the pandemic. In January 2022, in the wake of the Omicron variant surge, Sixx was asked by a fan on Twitter if The Stadium Tour was still happening this year; his response was, "We're 1000% hitting the road with Def Leppard for The Stadium Tour in mid-June...I can't f'ckin wait..." Just prior to the start of the tour, Def Leppard guitarist Phil Collen announced that Mötley Crüe had "signed up" for another tour together in Europe, which is slated to take place in 2023; this claim was later confirmed by Def Leppard frontman Joe Elliott.

In November 2021, Mötley Crüe sold their entire back catalogue to BMG Rights Management.

In September 2022, Neil announced in an interview with the Las Vegas Review-Journal that the band would return for a US tour in 2023. In that same interview, he also ruled out the possibility of further studio albums, stating that they were "strictly a touring band".

On October 26, 2022, Mick Mars retired as a touring member of the band due to ongoing health issues, according to a statement released by Mars' publicist. The next day, the band confirmed that John 5 would take Mars' place as their new touring guitarist. In a December interview with A Radio Rock in Brazil, Sixx confirmed that the band isn't going away anytime soon, and stated that the band will be touring for eight more years.

Musical style
Mötley Crüe's musical style has been described as heavy metal, glam metal, hard rock, glam rock, and power pop. According to AllMusic, "[they have] a knack for melding pop hooks to heavy metal theatrics." The band changed to a more alternative metal and grunge sound on Mötley Crüe (1994) and industrial rock on Generation Swine (1997).

Legacy
Music critic Martin Popoff's book The Top 500 Heavy Metal Songs of All Time lists seven of the band's songs in its ranking. Mötley Crüe was ranked tenth on MTV's list of "Top 10 Heavy Metal Bands of All-Time" and ninth on "VH1's All Time Top Ten Metal Bands". Music website Loudwire named the band the 22nd greatest metal band of all-time. Spin named Shout at the Devil the 11th best metal album of all-time. In 2013 LA Weekly named the band the 3rd best "hair metal" band of all-time. Rolling Stone named Too Fast For Love the 22nd best metal album of all-time.

In 2006, the band received a star on the Hollywood Walk of Fame.

In 2014, the tribute album Nashville Outlaws was released, featuring country music stars including Rascal Flatts, LeAnn Rimes and Darius Rucker covering various Mötley Crüe songs. The album debuted at number 2 on the Billboard Country Album chart and number 5 on the Billboard 200.

Band members
Current members
 Nikki Sixx – bass guitar, backing vocals, keyboards 
 Mick Mars – lead and rhythm guitar, backing vocals 
 Vince Neil – lead vocals, occasional rhythm guitar 
 Tommy Lee – drums, backing vocals, piano 

Current touring musicians
 John 5 – lead and rhythm guitars, backing vocals 
Laura D'Anzieri – backing vocals, dancer 
Bailey Swift – backing vocals, dancer 
Hannah Sutton – backing vocals, dancer 

Former members
 Greg Leon – lead and rhythm guitars, lead vocals 
 John Corabi – lead vocals, rhythm guitar, bass guitar 
 Randy Castillo – drums 

Former touring musicians
 Emi Canyn – backing vocals 
 Donna McDaniel – backing vocals 
 Jozie DiMaria – dancer 
 Pearl Aday – backing vocals 
 Samantha Maloney – drums 
 Will Hunt – drums 
 Morgan Rose – drums 
 Allison Kyler – backing vocals, dancer 
 Annalisia Simone – backing vocals, dancer 
 Sofia Toufa – backing vocals, dancer 
 Tommy Clufetos – drums 

Timeline

Awards and nominations

Discography

 Too Fast for Love (1981)
 Shout at the Devil (1983)
 Theatre of Pain (1985)
 Girls, Girls, Girls (1987)
 Dr. Feelgood (1989)
 Mötley Crüe (1994)
 Generation Swine (1997)
 New Tattoo (2000)
 Saints of Los Angeles (2008)

Tours

 1981: Anywhere, USA Tour
 1981–1982: Boys in Action Tour
 1982: Crüesing Through Canada Tour
 1985–1986: Welcome to the Theatre of Pain Tour
 1987–1988: Girls, Girls, Girls Tour  Tour
 October 1989 August 1990: Dr. Feelgood World Tour
 1991: Monsters of Rock Tour
 1994: Anywhere There's Electricity Tour
 1997: Live Swine Listening Party Tour
 1997: Mötley Crüe vs. The Earth Tour
 1998–1999: Greatest Hits Tour
 June–September 1999: Maximum Rock Tour
 1999: Welcome to the Freekshow Tour
 2000: Maximum Rock 2000 Tour
 2000: New Tattoo Tour
 2005: Red, White & Crüe ... Better Live Than Dead Tour
 2005–2006: Carnival of Sins Tour
 2007: Mötley Crüe Tour
 July–August 2008: Crüe Fest Tour
 October 2008 July 2009: Saints of Los Angeles Tour
 July–September 2010: Crüe Fest 2 Tour
 2010: The Dead of Winter Tour
 2010: Ozzfest Tour
 2011: Glam-A-Geddon Tour
 October 2011: Mötley Crüe 30th Anniversary Tour
 2011: Mötley Crüe England Tour
 2012: European Tour
 July 2012–March 2013: The Tour
 April–July 2013: North American Tour
 July 2014 December 2015: The Final Tour
 June 2022–September 2022: The Stadium Tour
 February 2023–August 2023: The World Tour

References

Notes

Citations

External links

 
 
 Mötley Crüe Videos
 Mötley Crüe Tour Page
 Mötley Crüe live photo gallery

 
1981 establishments in California
2015 disestablishments in California
Elektra Records artists
Glam metal musical groups from California
Hard rock musical groups from California
Heavy metal musical groups from California
Kerrang! Awards winners
Musical groups disestablished in 2015
Musical groups established in 1981
Musical groups from Los Angeles
Musical groups reestablished in 2018
Musical quartets
Roadrunner Records artists